Cochran House or Cochran Farm or Cochran Barn may refer to:

Cochran–Wilson–Owen Estate, Fort Payne, Alabama, listed on the Alabama Register of Landmarks and Heritage in DeKalb–Jackson county
Killian–Appleton–Cochran House, Fort Payne, Alabama, listed on the Alabama Register of Landmarks and Heritage in DeKalb–Jackson county
Guy H. Cochran House, Loma Drive, Los Angeles, California, designed by Elmer Grey
Cochran House, a facility at the former Fairfield State Hospital in Newtown, Connecticut
Cochran Grange, also known as John P. Cochran House, NRHP-listed in Middletown, Delaware
Cochran–Helton–Lindley House, Bloomington, Indiana, listed on the NRHP in Monroe County
Jehiel Cochran House, Andover, Massachusetts, NRHP-listed
Cochran–Cassanova House, Ocean Springs, Mississippi, listed on the NRHP in Jackson County
William Cochran House, Stevensville, Montana, listed on the NRHP in Ravalli County
Cochran Farm, Millville, Ohio, NRHP-listed
Cochran House, Trinway, Ohio, a historic house
Hargis–Mitchell–Cochran House, Wynnewood, Oklahoma, listed on the NRHP in Garvin County
William Cochran Barn, Brownsville, Oregon, listed on the NRHP in Linn County
Cochran–Rice Farm Complex, Cottage Grove, Oregon, listed on the NRHP in Lane County, Oregon
 Henry Cochran house, 3511 Baring Street, Philadelphia, Pennsylvania, designed by Wilson Eyre
Mary Cochrane Barn, Maryville, Tennessee, listed on the NRHP in Blount County
Neill–Cochran House, Austin, Texas, NRHP-listed

See also
Butte–Cochran Charcoal Ovens, Florence, Arizona, NRHP-listed
Cochran Municipal Building and School, Cochran, Georgia, NRHP-listed
Philip G. Cochran Memorial United Methodist Church, Dawson, Pennsylvania, NRHP-listed